Lodewijk Frederik Hendrik (Louis) Apol (6 September 1850 in The Hague - 22 November 1936 in The Hague) was a Dutch painter and one of the most prominent representatives of the Hague School. 

Apol's talent was discovered early in his life and his father ordered private lessons for him. His teachers were J.F. Hoppenbrouwers and P.F. Stortenbeker. He received a scholarship from the Dutch King Willem III in 1868. Apol specialized in winter landscapes; people are seldom depicted in his paintings. He mostly painted snowy forest landscapes with subtle man-made artefacts, such as a bridge or fence.

In 1880 Apol took part in an expedition on the SS Willem Barents to Spitsbergen in the Arctic Ocean. The impressions of this journey were a source of inspiration during his whole life.

His work is widely spread and found in the USA, Canada, United Kingdom, Belgium, Germany and the Netherlands. The Rijksmuseum Amsterdam and the Gemeentemuseum Den Haag have work of Louis Apol in their collection. A street is named after him in the neighborhood of streets named after 19th and 20th century Dutch painters in Overtoomse Veld-Noord, Amsterdam.

References

External links
Examples of paintings of Louis Apol, Museum Nunspeet
Winter scene, Rijksmuseum Amsterdam
Louis Apol paintings
Winter landscape in the Teylers Museum Haarlem

1850 births
1936 deaths
Artists from The Hague
19th-century Dutch painters
Dutch male painters
20th-century Dutch painters
19th-century Dutch male artists
20th-century Dutch male artists